Emil Karl Haberer (February 2, 1878 – October 19, 1951) was a catcher and corner infielder in Major League Baseball who played for the Cincinnati Reds in part of three seasons spanning 1901–1909.

Besides, Haberer played with the Cincinnati Elks lodge baseball team in a game which was chronicled by the Cincinnati Historical Society bulletin.

Sources

External links
, or SABR Biography Project

1878 births
1951 deaths
Baseball players from Ohio
Cincinnati Reds players
Major League Baseball catchers